The Peixe River is a river of Paraíba state in northeastern Brazil. It rises near Poço Dantas, and discharges into the Piranhas River.

It runs through the Valley of the Dinosaurs, a protected area holding dinosaur tracks, and gives its name to the municipality of São João do Rio do Peixe.

See also
List of rivers of Paraíba

References

Brazilian Ministry of Transport

Rivers of Paraíba